Ian Geoffrey Hannaford (6 March 1940 – 10 March 2022) was an Australian rules footballer who played for the Port Adelaide Football Club in the SANFL. Hannaford was born on 6 March 1940. He died on 10 March 2022, four days after his 82nd birthday.

References

1940 births
2022 deaths
Australian rules footballers from South Australia
Port Adelaide Football Club (SANFL) players
Port Adelaide Football Club players (all competitions)